Ange-Marie Hancock is the Dean's Professor of Gender Studies and Professor of Political Science and Gender and Sexuality Studies at the University of Southern California. Starting in January 2023, she will be the Executive Director of the Kirwan Institute for the Study of Race and Ethnicity at the Ohio State University. Hancock is a political theorist and scholar of intersectionality. Hancock is also CEO of RISIST, the Research Institute for the Study of Intersectionality and Social Transformation.

Education and early career 
Hancock received her B.A. in Politics from New York University in 1991. She earned an M.A. and Ph.D. in Political Science from University of North Carolina at Chapel Hill in 1997 and 2000, respectively. Before attending graduate school, Hancock was employed at the National Basketball Association, where she helped research and propose a business model for what would become the Women's National Basketball Association (WNBA).

Career 
Hancock is a scholar of intersectionality and political science. Scholars reviewing her 2016 book, Intersectionality: An Intellectual History, praised it for providing "a rich history of intersectional thought and practice" and write that Hancock's book "helps us move beyond some of the problems that have arisen as intersectionality has gained currency within the US academy."

Hancock has served on the editorial board of Perspectives on Politics and was a co-editor of Politics, Groups and Identities. Hancock is a political analyst for NBC4.

Books 
 Hancock, Ange-Marie. 2004. The Politics of Disgust and the Public Identity of the "Welfare Queen". New York, NY: New York University Press.
 Hancock, Ange-Marie. 2011. Solidarity Politics for Millennials: A Guide to Ending the Oppression Olympics. New York, NY: Palgrave-Macmillan.
 Hancock, Ange-Marie. 2016. Intersectionality: An Intellectual History. New York, NY: Oxford University Press.

Selected awards 
 Best Book, National Conference of Black Political Scientists, 2006-2007.
 Best First Book, American Political Science Association Organized Section on Race, Ethnicity & Politics, 2006-2007.

References 

American academics
Year of birth missing (living people)
Living people
New York University alumni
University of North Carolina at Chapel Hill alumni
University of Southern California faculty